Deadly Awards were an annual celebration of Australian Aboriginal and Torres Strait Islander achievement in music, sport, entertainment and community.

Music
Male Artist of the Year: Troy Cassar-Daley
Female Artist of the Year: Christine Anu
Most Promising New Talent in Music: South West Syndicate
Band of the Year: NoKTuRNL
Country Artist of the Year: Todd Williams
Single of the Year: Down River - The Wilcannia Mob
Album of the Year: Shakaya - Shakaya
Outstanding Contribution to Aboriginal and Torres Strait Islander Music: Archie Roach and Ruby Hunter

Sport
Male Sportsperson of the Year: Anthony Mundine
Female Sportsperson of the Year: Cathy Freeman
Most Promising New Talent in Sport: Daniel Motlop
Outstanding Achievement in Football: Rhys Wesser
Outstanding Contribution to Aboriginal and Torres Strait Islander Sport: Kyle Vander-Kuyp

The arts
Male Actor of the Year: Aaron Pedersen
Female Actor of the Year: Deborah Mailman
Male Dancer of the Year: Albert David
Female Dancer of the Year: Frances Rings

Community
Outstanding Achievement in Aboriginal and Torres Strait Islander Education: Tranby Aboriginal College
Outstanding Achievement in Aboriginal and Torres Strait Islander Health: Redfern AMS
Aboriginal and Torres Strait Islander Broadcaster of the Year: Lola Forrester – SBS

External links
Deadlys 2003 winners at Vibe

The Deadly Awards
2003 in Australian music
Indigenous Australia-related lists